Igor Leonidovich Kirillov (14 September 1932 – 29 October 2021) was a Soviet and Russian news presenter, announcer and actor. He was a news anchor for Soviet Central Television (CT USSR) and announcer for the CT USSR news program Vremya for 30 years. He was awarded the People's Artist of the USSR in 1988.

Early life and education
Kirillov was born in Moscow. His father, Leonid Mikhailovich Kirillov (1904–1979), was an engineer, and his mother, Revekka Veniaminovna Kirillova (1901–1995), was a librarian. He planned to become a director, but was admitted to the Gerasimov Institute of Cinematography to study acting. He left after one year and graduated from the Mikhail Shchepkin Higher Theatre School.

Career
After graduation, he worked at the Moscow Drama and Comedy Theatre. Two years later, in 1957, he won an audition to become a newsreader for Soviet Central Television. For 30 years he co-anchored the network's prime time news broadcast Vremya, with Nonna Bodrova and Anna Shatilova as co-anchors during his tenure. He was known for his slow delivery, which he told an interviewer was a Russian preference, and also said was for the benefit of Soviet citizens with native languages other than Russian. During his tenure, Kirillov was the anchor for all of the Soviet Union's pivotal events, covering the annual celebrations of state occasions, the death and state funeral of Leonid Brezhnev and his successors Yuri Andropov and Konstantin Chernenko, and as well as Yuri Gagarin's orbit of the earth in 1961, the Soviet government's decision to invade Afghanistan in 1979, and the Moscow Olympics the following year. Kirillov also accompanied Soviet leaders on their official visits to foreign countries to report on location.

He also made cameo appearances in some Russian films, and in Sting's 1985 hit "Russians", and was host of the Russian TV pop music show and the annual Песня года (Song of the Year). He retired as a newsreader in 1987, joining CT USSR (later Ostankino TV, then ORT). He retired in 1996, but he occasionally appeared as an emcee for some concerts and the annual Red Square Victory Day parade.

Personal life and death
He married his first wife, Irina Vsevolodovna Kirillova, a sound engineer, while they were both students; she died in 2004. Their daughter, Anna, is a professional pianist; their son died in 2011. He nursed his wife's sister, Natalya, during a two-year illness that ended with her death also in 2011. He later remarried to Tatyana Aleksandrovna Kirillova.

Kirillov died on October 29, 2021, at the age of 89, the last surviving news announcer to have been made a People's Artist of the USSR. He had been hospitalized for circulatory problems in September and died after contracting COVID-19.

Awards and honours 
 Honored Artist of the RSFSR (1968)
 USSR State Prize (1977)
 Order of Friendship of Peoples (1980)
 People's Artist of the RSFSR (1982)
 People's Artist of the USSR (1988)
 Order "For Merit to the Fatherland", 4th class (2006)
 Order "For Merit to the Fatherland", 3rd class (2011)
 Order of Honour (2018)
 Order of the Red Banner of Labour
 Medal "In Commemoration of the 850th Anniversary of Moscow"

References

External links

 Жизнь артиста: Игорь Кириллов, ТК-Інтер (video) 
 Профессия длиною в жизнь, journs.ru 

1932 births
2021 deaths
20th-century Russian male actors
21st-century Russian male actors
Male actors from Moscow
Communist Party of the Soviet Union members
Gerasimov Institute of Cinematography alumni
Honorary Members of the Russian Academy of Arts
Honored Artists of the RSFSR
People's Artists of the RSFSR
People's Artists of the USSR
Recipients of the Order "For Merit to the Fatherland", 3rd class
Recipients of the Order "For Merit to the Fatherland", 4th class
Recipients of the Order of Friendship of Peoples
Recipients of the Order of Honour (Russia)
Recipients of the Order of the Red Banner of Labour
Recipients of the USSR State Prize
Radio and television announcers
Russian male journalists
Russian male film actors
Russian male stage actors
Russian male voice actors
Russian television journalists
Russian television presenters
Soviet journalists
Soviet male film actors
Soviet male stage actors
Soviet male voice actors
Soviet television presenters
Deaths from the COVID-19 pandemic in Russia
Burials at Novodevichy Cemetery